Paul Garelli (23 April 1924  – 8 July 2006) was a French Assyriologist, directeur de recherche au CNRS, professor at the Sorbonne and the l'EPHE, a member of the Académie des inscriptions et belles-lettres and professor at the Collège de France.

Early life 
Paul Garelli was born in Croydon, London. He spent his early years in Switzerland and Istanbul, where his father was director general of the Ottoman Bank.

Education
He did his graduate studies in Geneva and Paris. He obtained a BA in economics and in 1951 the degree of the École pratique des hautes études (historical and philological studies section).

Career
He would return to the EPHE in 1974 as director of studies at the IVth section.

In 1958, Paul Garelli joined the Centre national de la recherche scientifique where he became a research fellow in 1967 at the head of the Archaeology and history section of the Assyrian-Babylonian countries. He was part of the National Committee of the CNRS.

A Doctor of Letters (History) in 1963, he was a lecturer and professor at the Sorbonne from 1967 to 1986. He taught history of the peoples of the Semitic East.

Paul Garelli was a member of the Société Asiatique (1972) and of the international committee of Ebla (Rome) (1977) and president of the François Thureau-Dangin group (1975).

In 1982, he was elected ordinary member of the Académie des Inscriptions et Belles-Lettres then, in 1986, professor of Assyriologie at the Collège de France.

Publications 
1963: Les Assyriens en Cappadoce, Maisonneuve,
1974: Les Empires Mésopotamie-Israël (en coll.), reprint 1997
1990:  L'Assyriologie, PUF, coll. "Que sais-je?",
1997–2002 : Le Proche-Orient asiatique, PUF : volume 1, 1997, with Jean-Marie Durand and Hatice Gonnet ; volume 2, 2002, with André Lemaire

Bibliography 
  Dominique Charpin and F. Joannès (dir.), Marchands, diplomates et empereurs, Études sur la civilisation mésopotamienne offertes à Paul Garelli, Paris, 1991

References

External links 
 Décès de Paul Garelli on Digitorient.com
 Publications de Paul Garelli on Cairn
 Paul Garelli, L'Assyriologie, Presses Universitaires de France, 1964 (« Que sais- je? »  
 Biographie de Paul Garelli, EPHE by Dominique Charpin, site of the EPHE
 Biographie de Paul Garelli, AIBL, site de l'Académie des inscriptions et belles-lettres

French Assyriologists
École pratique des hautes études alumni
Academic staff of the École pratique des hautes études
Members of the Académie des Inscriptions et Belles-Lettres
Academic staff of the Collège de France
Members of the Société Asiatique
Officiers of the Ordre des Arts et des Lettres
People from Croydon
1924 births
2006 deaths
French expatriates in the United Kingdom
French expatriates in Switzerland
French expatriates in Turkey
Assyriologists